Rondo or Rondó is a given name and surname. Notable people with the name include:

Given name
 Rondo Hatton (1894–1946), American actor
 Rondo Cameron (1925–2001), professor

Surname
 Abelardo Gamarra Rondó (1850–1924), Peruvian writer, composer and journalist
 Don Rondo (1930–2011), American singer
 José Luis Rondo (born 1976), Equatoguinean former football defender
 Manuel Rondo (born 1967), Equatoguinean long-distance runner
 Quando Rondo (born 1999), American rapper and singer
 Rajon Rondo (born 1986), American professional basketball player